The 3rd constituency of Allier is a French legislative constituency in the Allier département.

Members elected

Election results

2022

 
 
 
 
 
 
|-
| colspan="8" bgcolor="#E9E9E9"|
|-

2017

2012

|- style="background-color:#E9E9E9;text-align:center;"
! colspan="2" rowspan="2" style="text-align:left;" | Candidate
! rowspan="2" colspan="2" style="text-align:left;" | Party
! colspan="2" | 1st round
! colspan="2" | 2nd round
|- style="background-color:#E9E9E9;text-align:center;"
! width="75" | Votes
! width="30" | %
! width="75" | Votes
! width="30" | %
|-
| style="background-color:" |
| style="text-align:left;" | Gérard Charasse
| style="text-align:left;" | Radical Party of the Left
| PRG
| 
| 42.51%
| 
| 57.37%
|-
| style="background-color:" |
| style="text-align:left;" | Claude Malhuret
| style="text-align:left;" | Union for a Popular Movement
| UMP
| 
| 32.38%
| 
| 42.63%
|-
| style="background-color:" |
| style="text-align:left;" | Claudine Lopez
| style="text-align:left;" | National Front
| FN
| 
| 13.64%
| colspan="2" style="text-align:left;" |
|-
| style="background-color:" |
| style="text-align:left;" | Pascale Semet
| style="text-align:left;" | Left Front
| FG
| 
| 5.63%
| colspan="2" style="text-align:left;" |
|-
| style="background-color:" |
| style="text-align:left;" | Anne Babian-Lhermet
| style="text-align:left;" | The Greens
| VEC
| 
| 1.92%
| colspan="2" style="text-align:left;" |
|-
| style="background-color:" |
| style="text-align:left;" | Sylvie Rasile
| style="text-align:left;" | Democratic Movement
| MoDem
| 
| 1.26%
| colspan="2" style="text-align:left;" |
|-
| style="background-color:" |
| style="text-align:left;" | Pascal Javerliat
| style="text-align:left;" | Radical Party
| PRV
| 
| 0.69%
| colspan="2" style="text-align:left;" |
|-
| style="background-color:" |
| style="text-align:left;" | Patrice Rucar
| style="text-align:left;" | Ecologist
| ECO
| 
| 0.65%
| colspan="2" style="text-align:left;" |
|-
| style="background-color:" |
| style="text-align:left;" | Jean-Marc Caecassin
| style="text-align:left;" | New Centre-Presidential Majority
| NCE
| 
| 0.58%
| colspan="2" style="text-align:left;" |
|-
| style="background-color:" |
| style="text-align:left;" | Monique Roche
| style="text-align:left;" | Far Left
| EXG
| 
| 0.44%
| colspan="2" style="text-align:left;" |
|-
| style="background-color:" |
| style="text-align:left;" | Renaud Siry
| style="text-align:left;" | Ecologist
| ECO
| 
| 0.30%
| colspan="2" style="text-align:left;" |
|-
| colspan="8" style="background-color:#E9E9E9;"|
|- style="font-weight:bold"
| colspan="4" style="text-align:left;" | Total
| 
| 100%
| 
| 100%
|-
| colspan="8" style="background-color:#E9E9E9;"|
|-
| colspan="4" style="text-align:left;" | Registered voters
| 
| style="background-color:#E9E9E9;"|
| 
| style="background-color:#E9E9E9;"|
|-
| colspan="4" style="text-align:left;" | Blank/Void ballots
| 
| 1.64%
| 
| 3.25%
|-
| colspan="4" style="text-align:left;" | Turnout
| 
| 60.52%
| 
| 59.99%
|-
| colspan="4" style="text-align:left;" | Abstentions
| 
| 39.48%
| 
| 40.01%
|-
| colspan="8" style="background-color:#E9E9E9;"|
|- style="font-weight:bold"
| colspan="6" style="text-align:left;" | Result
| colspan="2" style="background-color:" | RDG GAIN
|}

2007

|- style="background-color:#E9E9E9;text-align:center;"
! colspan="2" rowspan="2" style="text-align:left;" | Candidate
! rowspan="2" colspan="2" style="text-align:left;" | Party
! colspan="2" | 1st round
! colspan="2" | 2nd round
|- style="background-color:#E9E9E9;text-align:center;"
! width="75" | Votes
! width="30" | %
! width="75" | Votes
! width="30" | %
|-
| style="background-color:" |
| style="text-align:left;" | Jean Mallot
| style="text-align:left;" | Socialist Party
| PS
| 
| 23.41%
| 
| 50.80%
|-
| style="background-color:" |
| style="text-align:left;" | Yves Simon
| style="text-align:left;" | Union for a Popular Movement
| UMP
| 
| 39.87%
| 
| 49.20%
|-
| style="background-color:" |
| style="text-align:left;" | Dominique Bidet
| style="text-align:left;" | Communist
| COM
| 
| 18.38%
| colspan="2" style="text-align:left;" |
|-
| style="background-color:" |
| style="text-align:left;" | Claude Joly
| style="text-align:left;" | Democratic Movement
| MoDem
| 
| 5.64%
| colspan="2" style="text-align:left;" |
|-
| style="background-color:" |
| style="text-align:left;" | Jean-Louis Baudriller
| style="text-align:left;" | National Front
| FN
| 
| 3.71%
| colspan="2" style="text-align:left;" |
|-
| style="background-color:" |
| style="text-align:left;" | Marc Boyer
| style="text-align:left;" | Movement for France
| MPF
| 
| 2.57%
| colspan="2" style="text-align:left;" |
|-
| style="background-color:" |
| style="text-align:left;" | Anne-Marie Chambeau
| style="text-align:left;" | The Greens
| VEC
| 
| 1.59%
| colspan="2" style="text-align:left;" |
|-
| style="background-color:" |
| style="text-align:left;" | Françoise Gaillardon
| style="text-align:left;" | Far Left
| EXG
| 
| 1.46%
| colspan="2" style="text-align:left;" |
|-
| style="background-color:" |
| style="text-align:left;" | Bernard Lebel
| style="text-align:left;" | Far Left
| EXG
| 
| 1.07%
| colspan="2" style="text-align:left;" |
|-
| style="background-color:" |
| style="text-align:left;" | Gérard-Pierre Guillaumin
| style="text-align:left;" | Ecologist
| ECO
| 
| 0.96%
| colspan="2" style="text-align:left;" |
|-
| style="background-color:" |
| style="text-align:left;" | Véronique Deris-Targon
| style="text-align:left;" | Ecologist
| ECO
| 
| 0.73%
| colspan="2" style="text-align:left;" |
|-
| style="background-color:" |
| style="text-align:left;" | Mireille Marnay
| style="text-align:left;" | Divers
| DIV
| 
| 0.60%
| colspan="2" style="text-align:left;" |
|-
| style="background-color:" |
| style="text-align:left;" | Charles Castanier
| style="text-align:left;" | Divers
| DIV
| 
| 0.00%
| colspan="2" style="text-align:left;" |
|-
| colspan="8" style="background-color:#E9E9E9;"|
|- style="font-weight:bold"
| colspan="4" style="text-align:left;" | Total
| 
| 100%
| 
| 100%
|-
| colspan="8" style="background-color:#E9E9E9;"|
|-
| colspan="4" style="text-align:left;" | Registered voters
| 
| style="background-color:#E9E9E9;"|
| 
| style="background-color:#E9E9E9;"|
|-
| colspan="4" style="text-align:left;" | Blank/Void ballots
| 
| 2.68%
| 
| 3.45%
|-
| colspan="4" style="text-align:left;" | Turnout
| 
| 65.59%
| 
| 67.92%
|-
| colspan="4" style="text-align:left;" | Abstentions
| 
| 34.41%
| 
| 32.08%
|-
| colspan="8" style="background-color:#E9E9E9;"|
|- style="font-weight:bold"
| colspan="6" style="text-align:left;" | Result
| colspan="2" style="background-color:" | PS GAIN
|}

2002

 
 
 
 
 
 
 
|-
| colspan="8" bgcolor="#E9E9E9"|
|-

1997

Sources
 Official results of French elections from 1998: 

3